The All-German People's Party (GVP) was a minor political party in West Germany active between 1952 and 1957. It was a Christian, pacifist, centre-left party that opposed the re-armament of West Germany because it believed that the remilitarisation and NATO integration would make German reunification impossible, deepen the division of Europe and pose a danger to peace.

Most members were dissidents from the Christian Democratic Union or German Centre Party who disagreed with the foreign and intra-German policy of Konrad Adenauer's government. The party failed to win broader public support, only gaining 1.2% in the federal election. The party dissolved and many members joined the Social Democratic Party (SPD), with a number of former GVP activists rising to high-ranking positions, including two Presidents of Germany, Gustav Heinemann and Johannes Rau.

Foundation and aims 
The party was formed by a number of former CDU or German Centre Party members and former Confessing Church supporters, who opposed the re-armament of Germany and a close co-operation with the Western powers. The forerunner of the party was the "Emergency Association for Peace in Europe" (Notgemeinschaft für den Frieden Europas), founded in November 1951 by Gustav Heinemann and Robert Scholl, the father of resistance fighter Sophie Scholl .

Heinemann was the president of the synod of the Evangelical Church in Germany and had been a CDU member and minister of the interior in Adenauer's first cabinet from 1949 to 1950 before he resigned in protest against Adenauer's secret negotiations with the Americans about a West German contribution to a Western military alliance. Together with Helene Wessel, then chair of the Catholic Centre Party, and two other persons he formed the steering committee of the party which did not have a chairman. Heinemann and Wessel often appeared together in order to appeal to both Protestants and Catholics.

The party believed in détente and favoured plebiscites. It refused to monopolise Christian faith for anticommunist positions and advocated to fight antisemitism and religious prejudice. On economic issues, the party refrained from taking a definite position given that its members' views were too diverse.

Elections and legacy 
In the only Bundestag election the party took part in, the 1953 election, they managed to obtain only 1.3% of votes (for the common list with the East German-funded Bund der Deutschen ("Alliance of Germans"). The only—moderate—electoral success of the GVP were the local elections in the state of North Rhine-Westphalia (both Heinemann's and Wessel's home state) on October 28, 1956, where the party got 78 seats. After they could only win 1.6% in the Baden-Württemberg legislative election of 1956, the GVP was formally disbanded on May 19, 1957.

The party recommended that members join the Social Democratic Party of Germany. Some members had already left the GVP for the SPD. The Social Democrats had refused to adopt GVP members on their lists for the federal election of 1957 but granted good list positions to some former GVP members (among them Heinemann and Wessel). This helped SPD to open itself to parts of the Christian, especially Protestant, middle-class.

A number of former GVP members had substantial careers in the Social Democratic party. Erhard Eppler became federal minister on development aid, Jürgen Schmude on education and Diether Posser state minister in North Rhine-Westphalia. Most noteworthy, Gustav Heinemann and Johannes Rau, two of the only three SPD Presidents of Germany, had both been earlier GVP members.

Further reading 

 Siegfried Heimann: Die Gesamtdeutsche Volkspartei; in: Richard Stöss (Hrsg.): Parteien-Handbuch. Die Parteien der Bundesrepublik Deutschland 1945–1980, Band 2; Opladen: Westdeutscher Verlag, 1984; 
 Barbara Jobke: Aufstieg und Verfall einer wertorientierten Bewegung. Dargestellt am Beispiel der Gesamtdeutschen Volkspartei; Universität, Dissertation Tübingen 1974
 Diether Koch: Heinemann und die Deutschlandfrage; München: Kaiser, 1972; 
 Josef Müller: Die Gesamtdeutsche Volkspartei. Entstehung und Politik unter dem Primat nationaler Wiedervereinigung 1950-1957; Düsseldorf: Droste-Verlag, 1990;

References 

Political parties established in 1952
Defunct Christian political parties
Defunct political parties in Germany
Christian democratic parties in Germany
Pacifist parties
Political parties disestablished in 1957
1952 establishments in West Germany
1957 disestablishments in West Germany
Centrist parties in Germany